Blumlein is a surname. Notable people with the surname include:

Alan Blumlein, electronic engineer
Blumlein Pair, a stereo recording technique invented by Alan Blumlein
Blumlein transmission line, used to create high-voltage pulses with short rise and fall times
Michael Blumlein, fiction writer and physician